Netaji Palkar (1620–1681) was a Sardar Senapati or Sarnaubat (Commander-in-Chief) under Chhatrapati Shivaji, founder of the Maratha empire.

Family history
Netaji Palkar was born in a small village, called Chouk in Khalapur, Maharashtra, India in a Marathi Chandraseniya Kayastha Prabhu family. Netaji's father was a major Jagirdar in Western Maharashtra under the Adil Shah.

Military career
Palkar was made Sarnaubat in the year 1657 after the death of Mankoji Dahatonde. During the period of the rise of Shivaji from 1645 to 1665, Netaji was given charge of many expeditions which he successfully completed. His greatest success was the campaign against the Adilshah of Bijapur Sultanate that followed the killing of Afzal Khan. His standing among the local population was such that he was known as Prati Shivaji (image of Chhatrapati Shivaji). He disturbed lot of area of Mughals till year 1665. As he did not inform about the actions of Jai Singh and Dilerkhan, Shivaji was upset at him. After the 1665 Treaty of Purandar between Jai Singh and Shivaji, Shivaji was forced to give up 23 forts to the Mughals and also fight against the Adilshah of Bijapur. During this period, Netaji Palkar defected to the Bijapur forces. It was the strategy of Shivaji so as to reduce his own military power as Aurangzeb wanted Shivaji to fight for him. Thus Shivaji strategised to defect Netaji Palkar to Adilshah of Bijapur. Therefore as expected by Shivaji, Mughals were unable to conquer Adilshah.

After Shivaji's meeting with Aurangzeb at Agra, Netaji Palkar joined the service of Jai Singh. When Shivaji escaped from Agra, Mirza Raja fell out of favor of Aurangzeb.

Capture by the Mughals, conversion to Islam and re-conversion to Hinduism
After Shivaji's escape from Agra, Aurangzeb, as a revenge, ordered Jai Singh to arrest Netaji Palkar. He was kept under arrest at Dharur fort for a few days. Also it is said that at the same fort, Jijabai, Shivaji's mother, sent some money to Jai Singh, when demanded by Shivaji to distribute sweets in Agra. Netaji Palkar was then converted to Islam. His wives were thereafter brought to Delhi and also converted in order for Netaji to remarry them in the Islamic way. Taking up the name of Muhammad Kuli Khan, Netaji Palkar was appointed as garrison commander of the Kandahar fort in Afghanistan. He tried to escape but was traced and trapped at Lahore. Thereafter, on the battlefields of Kandahar and Kabul, he fought for the Mughals against rebel Pashtuns. Thus he gained the good faith of Aurangzeb and was sent to the Deccan along with Commander Diler Khan to conquer Shivaji's territory.

However, after entering Maharashtra, Netaji joined Shivaji's troops and went to Raigad. Thus, after a decade in Mughal captivity, Netaji turned up at the court of Shivaji, asking to be taken back into the Hindu fold. He was converted back to Hinduism, into his own community of CKP. He died in 1681.

Military campaigns
Netaji led battles against the Adilshah at Panhala, Shahapur, Tikona and Vijapur (Bijapur) in 1660 and at Khatav, Mangalvedha, Phaltan, Taathvada, and Bijapur in 1665.

References

Military history of India
Indian military leaders
People of the Maratha Empire
Converts to Hinduism from Islam
Indian former Muslims